Chaetocalyx is a genus of lianas in the legume family, Fabaceae. It belongs to the subfamily Faboideae, and was recently assigned to the informal monophyletic Adesmia clade of the Dalbergieae. Members of this genus are found in Central and South America. Chaetocalyx can be distinguished from most other legumes by its climbing habit, its imparipinnate leaves, and, in most species, by its elongate loments. It can be distinguished from Nissolia, which also has a climbing habit, by the articles of the loments, which are uniform in size in Chaetocalyx, rather than with a terminal, expanded, winglike article as in Nissolia. Unlike most papilionoid legumes, Chaetocalyx species do not form root nodules.

Species
Chaetocalyx comprises the following species:
 Chaetocalyx acutifolia (Vogel) Benth.

 Chaetocalyx blanchetiana (Benth.) Rudd
 Chaetocalyx bracteosa Rudd
 Chaetocalyx brasiliensis (Vogel) Benth.
 Chaetocalyx chacoensis Vanni

 Chaetocalyx klugii Rudd

 Chaetocalyx latisiliqua Benth.—chupa-chupa
 Chaetocalyx longiflora A. Gray

 Chaetocalyx longiloba Rudd

 Chaetocalyx nigricans Burkart

 Chaetocalyx platycarpa (Harms) Rudd

 Chaetocalyx scandens (L.) Urb.
 var. fissus (Pittier) D. Velázquez
 var. pubescens (DC.) Rudd
 var. scandens (L.) Urb.

 Chaetocalyx subulatus Mackinder

 Chaetocalyx tomentosa (Gardner) Rudd

 Chaetocalyx weberbaueri Harms

References

Dalbergieae
Fabaceae genera